The Ontario Rugby Football Union (ORFU) was an early amateur Canadian football league comprising teams in the Canadian province of Ontario. The ORFU was founded on Saturday, January 6, 1883 and in 1903 became the first major competition to adopt the Burnside rules, from which the modern Canadian football code would evolve.

History
W. A. Hewitt was vice-president of the ORFU for the 1905 and 1906 seasons, and a representative of the Toronto Argonauts. He sought for ORFU to have uniform rules of play with the Canadian Rugby Union (CRU), with a preference to use the snap-back system of play used in Ontario. When the CRU did not adopt the system, his motion was approved for the ORFU to adopt the CRU rules in 1906. In December 1906, The Gazette reported that a proposal originated from Ottawa for the ORFU and the Quebec Rugby Football Union to merge, which would allow for higher calibre of play and create rivalries. Hewitt helped organize the meeting which established the Interprovincial Rugby Football Union (IRFU) in 1907.

For most of the first half of the 20th century, the ORFU was one of the stronger unions in Canada, and its champion was a frequent fixture in the Grey Cup even as the game became increasingly professionalized in the 1930s.

During World War II, the Ontario-based military teams played in the ORFU, filling the gap during the suspension of play by the IRFU (Toronto Navy – H.M.C.S. York played out of Varsity Stadium, using the Toronto Argonauts' equipment and uniforms.) The Toronto RCAF Hurricanes were the last amateur team to win the Grey Cup in 1942. Many from the ranks of the military teams in the ORFU became stars in the CFL after the war.

With the return of peace, however, the ORFU found it increasingly difficult to compete in an environment dominated by the IRFU and the Western Interprovincial Football Union, which had both become fully professional. Indeed, by then it was the only fully amateur union still challenging for the Grey Cup. Even so, it retained enough prestige that it played the WIFU champion for a berth in the Grey Cup final. The IRFU was reluctant to accept the WIFU as a full equal even after it was clear that its quality of play had become the equal of the IRFU.

The ORFU withdrew from Grey Cup competition in 1954. Although the amateurs would not be formally locked out of Grey Cup play for another four years, this heralded the start of the modern era of Canadian football.  The ORFU ceased to operate as a true senior league after 1960, but continued play at the intermediate level.  Eventually the word "senior" came to replace the word "intermediate."  By 1974, the ORFU had ceased to exist. However, the junior Ontario Rugby Football Union which was formed in 1890 lasted until the 1970 season.

Notable teams
 Toronto Football Club (1883–1895) 
 Toronto Argonauts (1898–1906)
 Toronto Athletic Club (1896), Toronto Athletic Club-Lornes (1897)
 Hamilton Tigers 1883–1906, 1948–1949
 Ottawa Football Club (1883–1897), Ottawa Rough Riders (1898–1906)
 Ottawa College Football Club (1885–1889, 1892–1898)
 Kingston Granites (1899–1901)
 Toronto Parkdale Canoe Club (1909–1910, 1912–1913, 1920–1923) 4 time ORFU champions, lost Grey Cup in 1909, 1913
 Hamilton Alerts – 1st Grey Cup Champions of the ORFU in 1912 (1911–1912, another team played by the name in 1940)
 Toronto Balmy Beach – 2 time Grey Cup Champions: 1927, 1930 (1924–1957)
 Sarnia Imperials – 2 time Grey Cup Champions: 1934, 1936 (1928–1955)
 Toronto Amateur Athletic Club – ORFU Champion 1908 and 1910
 Toronto Rugby and Athletic Association – ORFU Champion 1915, 1919 and 1920
 Hamilton (Flying) Wildcats – Grey Cup Champions: 1943 (1941–1947)
 Toronto Indians (1941–1948)
 Toronto RCAF Hurricanes  – Grey Cup Champions: 1942 (1942–1943)
 Ottawa Trojans (1943–1947) ORFU Champion 1947
 Windsor Rockets (1945–1950), Windsor Royals (1951–52)
 Brantford Redskins (1952–1953)
 Kitchener-Waterloo Dutchmen (1953–1959) ORFU Champion 1954–1957
 London Lords (1956–1970)
 Rochester Rockets (1956)
 Sarnia Golden Bears ORFU Champion (1958–59)
 Bramalea Satellites (1967–1970)

Champions

Most championships 
 12- Sarnia Imperials (1929, 1931–1939, 1951–52)
 10- Toronto Balmy Beach (1924–1927, 1930, 1940, 1945–46, 1950, 1953)
 8- Hamilton Tigers (1890, 1897, 1903–1906, 1948–49)
 5- Ottawa College Football Club (1885–1889)
 4- Toronto Parkdale Canoe Club (1909, 1913, 1921–22)
 4- Kitchener-Waterloo Dutchmen (1954–1957)
 3- Toronto Football Club 1883–84, Toronto Argonauts (1901)
 3- Ottawa Rough Riders (1898, 1900, 1902)
 3- Toronto Rugby and Athletic Association (1915, 1919–20)
 3- Hamilton Flying Wildcats (1941, 1943–44)
 2- Osgoode Hall (1891–92)
 2- Queen's University (1893–94)
 2- University of Toronto Varsity (1895, 1896)
 2- Toronto Amateur Athletic Club (1908, 1910)
 2- Hamilton Alerts (1911–12)
 2- Hamilton Rowing Club  (1914, 1923)
 2- Sarnia Golden Bears (1958–59)

Imperial Oil Trophy 
The Imperial Oil Trophy was awarded to the league's most valuable player.
 1934 Norm Perry – Sarnia Imperials
 1935 Hugh "Bummer" Stirling – Sarnia Imperials
 1936 Syd Reynolds – Toronto Balmy Beach Beachers
 1937 Ormond Beach – Sarnia Imperials
 1938 John Ferraro – Montreal Nationals
 1939 Eddie Thompson – Toronto Balmy Beach Beachers
 1940 Nick Paithouski – Sarnia 2/26 Battery
 1941 Al Lenard – Hamilton Wildcats
 1942 Bill Stukus – Toronto RCAF Hurricanes
 1943 Bob Cosgrove – Toronto RCAF Hurricanes
 1944 Joe Krol – Hamilton Wildcats
 1945 Arnie McWatters – Ottawa Trojans
 1946 Frank Gnup – Hamilton Wildcats
 1947 Bob Paffrath – Toronto Indians
 1948 Frank Filchock – Hamilton Tigers
 1949 Don "Sleepy" Knowles – Sarnia Imperials
 1950 Carl Galbreath – Toronto Balmy Beach Beachers
 1951 Bruce Mattingly – Sarnia Imperials
 1952 John Pont – Toronto Balmy Beach Beachers
 1953 Dick Gregory – Toronto Balmy Beach Beachers
 1954 Bob Celeri – Kitchener-Waterloo Dutchmen
 1955 Bob Celeri – Kitchener-Waterloo Dutchmen

See also
 Canadian Football League
 Quebec Rugby Football Union

References

External links
 https://web.archive.org/web/20110727185339/http://www.profootballresearchers.org/Coffin_Corner/07-An-245.pdf
 http://www.cflapedia.com

Defunct Canadian football leagues
Canadian football in Ontario
Defunct rugby union leagues in Canada
1883 establishments in Ontario
1974 disestablishments in Ontario